The Third cabinet of Steingrímur Hermannsson in Iceland was formed 10 September 1989.

Cabinet

Inaugural cabinet: 10 September 1989 – 30 April 1991

Change: 23 February 1990
The Ministry for the Environment (Umhverfisráðuneytið) was founded and led by Edvard Júlíus Sólnes. Steingrímur Hermannsson replaced Edvard Júlíus Sólnes as Minister of Statistics Iceland.

See also
Government of Iceland
Cabinet of Iceland

References

Steingrimur Hermannsson, Third cabinet of
Steingrimur Hermannsson, Third cabinet of
Steingrimur Hermannsson, Third cabinet of
Cabinets established in 1989
Cabinets disestablished in 1991
Progressive Party (Iceland)